Dr. Garry Conille (born 26 February 1966) is a Haitian academic, development worker, author, and former Prime Minister of Haiti. He submitted his resignation as prime minister on 24 February 2012, and was officially succeeded by Laurent Lamothe on 16 May 2012.

Early life
Garry Conille is the second of a family of four brothers (Serge, Pierre and Jean Conille). He is the son of Marie Antoinette Darbouze and Dr. Serge Conille, former Minister of Sports and Youth in the Duvalier government. He is married to Betty Rousseau, the step daughter of Marc Bazin, a former Prime Minister of Haiti and has twin girls, Soraya and Gaelle. Betty and her twin sister Kathy are Bazin's daughters from his wife Marie Yolène (née Sam) first mariage.

At the age of 14, he played soccer in the 2nd division of Haiti. He is also a music and arts master and performed at Carnegie Hall, in New York at the age of five.

Medical career

After graduating from Collège Canado-Haïtien and the Faculty of Medecine and Pharmacy of University of Haiti, Garry Conille obtained an MA in Political and Health Administration, as a fellow of the Fulbright Scholar Program at the University of North Carolina at Chapel Hill. Afterwards, he received a certificate of specialty in Gynecology and Obstetrics at Isaïe Jeanty maternity and a Ph.D. in Medicine at the University of Haiti.

Between July 1994 and June 1998, at the Haitian Association for the National Development, he developed and implemented a primary care system that provided basic health care in poor areas of Haiti. In August 1999, as an evaluation consultant, Garry Conille was responsible for the impact assessment of the Albert Schweitzer Hospital, an NGO in the field of community development, providing community care to over 260,000 people in Artibonite. Between the years 2000 - 2004, he created and hosted at Radio Vision 2000, the first national interactive program, focused on issues related to reproductive and sexual health.

United Nations career

Garry Conille began his career with the United Nations in 1999, as project officer (October 1999 - April 2001), then programme officer (April 2001 - October 2002) at United Nations Population Fund (UNFPA) Haiti. Between October 2002 and May 2004, he was technical advisor at Population Services International (PSI) Haiti.

In May 2004, he became an international official inside the United Nations system. Until January 2006, he was technical advisor of countries, then sub-regional technical advisor for UNFPA, Division Africa/Ethiopia. In this capacity, he was responsible for providing technical assistance and for ensuring capacity building in key areas of population and health reproduction.

In January - December 2006, he worked in a different field of the UN, as Technical Advisor for the Project Millennium Development Goals (MDGs) of the United Nations. In January 2007, Conille returned to UNFPA as Chief Technical Advisor for the Africa region and Global Program Coordinator for the security of inputs into reproductive health (UNFPA).

From September 2008 until his special assignment in Haiti, Garry Conille worked as team leader of the MDG Unit (part of the Office of Development Policy, UNDP). Here he organized jointly with UNDESA the process of preparing the report of the Secretary General on the MDGs, presented at the 2010 G8 Summit and then, with the International Monetary Fund, the preparation of Gleneagles scenarios in more than a dozen African countries.

In the wake of Haiti's 2010 earthquake, he was requested by the Administrator of UNDP and the UN Secretary General to assume the duties of head office of the Special Envoy of the Secretary General of the United Nations for Haiti. Conille worked with the Haitian government, the representation of the United Nations in Haiti and the main donors to develop and implement a strategic plan for the reconstruction of Haiti. He was also involved in coordinating the humanitarian response and in the establishment of the Interim Haiti Recovery Commission, the central structure of the reconstruction.

In June 2011, he resumed his work at UNDP as Resident Representative and Humanitarian Coordinator in Niger.

Prime Minister

By the end of August 2011, unofficial comments of Haitian politicians indicated that Garry Conille might be the next nomination for the post of Prime Minister. On 5 September, he received the official designation for this office from the President Michel Martelly. This would be the third nomination after Jean-Max Bellerive's resignation on 15 May, 2011 and the subsequent rejections by the Senate of the nominees Daniel Rouzier and Bernard Gousse.

Conille's nomination faces questions regarding his recent residency, as to whether he fulfills the requirement, prescribed in the Constitution of Haiti, of having resided in the country for five consecutive years prior to ratification. The president countered this argument by saying that Conille was exempt from the residency requirement because he had been working for the United Nations, paying taxes to the United Nations for Haiti.

The review and ratification process of his nomination began on 8 September, 2011. The Chamber of Deputies approved his appointment on September 16, in a unanimous vote. On October 5, 2011, the Haitian Parliament confirmed Garry Conille's appointment as Prime Minister, making him the 16th and the youngest Prime Minister under the current 1987 Constitution of the country.

Resignation
Conille resigned on February 24, 2012, following a loss of confidence in him from his ministers. He had clashed with ministers and Martelly over several issues, most recently a parliamentary investigation into government officials who hold dual nationality, which is illegal in Haiti. Martelly refused to comply with the investigation, stating the executive branch did not have to comply with the investigation. Some ministers cooperated with the investigation, but others refused. When Conille called a meeting with ministers to discuss the matter, none appeared. That incident demonstrated their lack of confidence and triggered the resignation. Conille remains prime minister until his successor is appointed, according to Article 165 of the constitution. He is succeeded by Laurent Lamothe after going through both parliamentary legislative chambers voting results with formal appointment in May 2012; he also held before his nomination and still keeps the ministry control for Foreign Affairs and Cults (Worships).

Publications

Recommendations to support Haiti’s economic development (2006), with Professor Jeffrey Sachs and Ambassador Gert Rosenthal (online)
ICT for Education and Development - Challenges of meeting the MDG 5 in Africa (2006) (online)
2004-2007 report of the Commission for Social Affairs: African Union ( 2007)
Cancer of the Cervix at Maternity Isaïe Jeanty (May 1992)
Sustainable financing of Health Care Reform in developing Countries ( May 1999)
Gender Poverty and health care reform (May 2001)
Social Franchising of reproductive health service in developing countries

References

External links
Official website
CV of Garry Conille

Prime Ministers of Haiti
Haitian diplomats
1966 births
Living people
Haitian academics
Haitian obstetricians and gynaecologists
Haitian officials of the United Nations
21st-century Haitian politicians
UNC Gillings School of Global Public Health alumni
Justice ministers of Haiti
Fulbright alumni